Christine Steel is an American actress, known for her role of Jenny Andrews on the TV series Team Knight Rider as well as the Tiberium Mutant Umagon in Command & Conquer: Tiberian Sun.

Early life 
Steel was born in Riverside, New Jersey, and spent the majority of her life in San Francisco. Steel's ancestry is combined Asian, Native American, Latino, and Italian.

Career 
She began acting at age 15 where she performed the role of Anita in her community theater's production of West Side Story. She attended UCLA, where she graduated cum laude in theater arts. Her other television credits include The District and 18 Wheels of Justice. Her film credits include roles in The Last Late Night and Even Steven. Steel also appears in the CD-ROM games Command & Conquer: Tiberian Sun and Riven: The Sequel to Myst.

Filmography

References

External links 
 
 
 Official site (archive)

American voice actresses
Living people
Year of birth missing (living people)
Place of birth missing (living people)
21st-century American women